Gerrit Krol (1 August 1934 − 24 November 2013) was a Dutch author, essayist and writer.

Krol was born in Groningen.  He studied mathematics and worked with Royal Dutch Shell and some of its operating units as computer programmer and system designer. Krol's debut consisted of poems published in 1961 in various Dutch literary magazines. In 1962 his first book De rokken van Joy Scheepmaker was published. Thereafter, he developed a typical writing style consisting of text mingled with abstract thoughts expressed in drawings and mathematical equations. His novel Het gemillimeterde hoofd is typical for this Krollesque style.

In 1986 Krol received the Constantijn Huygens Prize, and in 2001 the P. C. Hooft Award - the highest Dutch Governmental award for literature - for his complete oeuvre. On 20 October 2005, the 125th anniversary of the Amsterdam Free University, Krol received a Doctorate Honoris causa from this university.

Published works

De rokken van Joy Scheepmaker, 1962
Kwartslag, 1964
De zoon van de levende stad, 1966
Het gemillimeterde hoofd (English translation: The Cropped Head), 1967
De ziekte van Middleton, 1969
De laatste winter, 1970 
APPI, (essay) 1971
De man van het lateraal denken, (essay) 1971   
De chauffeur verveelt zich, 1973
In dienst van de 'Koninklijke', 1974
Hoe ziet ons gevoel er uit?, essay 1974 
De gewone man en het geluk of Waarom het niet goed is lid van een vakbond te zijn, (essays) 1975   
Halte opgeheven, (short stories) 1976
Polaroid, (poetry) 1976
De weg naar Sacramento, 1977
Over het huiselijk geluk en andere gedachten, (columns) 1978   
De t.v.-b.h., (columns) 1979
Een Fries huilt niet, 1980
De schrijver, zijn schaamte en zijn spiegels, (essay) 1981
De man achter het raam, 1982
Het vrije vers, (essays) 1982   
Scheve levens, 1983
De schriftelijke natuur, (essays) 1985   
Maurits en de feiten, 1986
Bijna voorjaar, (columns) 1986
De weg naar Tuktoyaktuk, 1987
De schoonheid van de witregel, (essays) 1987   
Helmholtz' paradijs, (essays) 1987 
Een ongenode gast, 1988
De Hagemeijertjes, 1990
Voor wie kwaad wil, (essay) 1990   
Wat mooi is moeilijk, (essays) 1991
Oude foto's, (short stories) 1992
Wat mooi is is moeilijk, (essays) 1992
Omhelzingen, 1993
Okoka's Wonderpark, 1994
De mechanica van het liegen, (essays) 1995
Middleton's dood, 1996
De kleur van Groningen, (poetry) 1997
60000 uur, (autobiography) 1998
Missie Novgorod, 1999
De vitalist, 2000
Geen man, want geen vrouw, (poetry) 2001
Minnaar, (poetry) 2001
'n Kleintje Krol, 2001   
Een schaaknovelle, 2002
Rondo Veneziano, 2004
Duivelskermis, 2007
De industrie geneest alle leed (verzamelde gedichten, 2009)
Verplaatste personen (verhalen, schilderijen Otto Krol, 2009)

References

External links

Gerrit Krol at Poetry International
Gerrit Krol at Digital Library for Dutch Literature (in Dutch - De schrijver, zijn schaamte en zijn spiegels available for free download)

1934 births
2013 deaths
20th-century Dutch poets
20th-century Dutch male writers
20th-century Dutch novelists
21st-century Dutch novelists
21st-century Dutch male writers
Constantijn Huygens Prize winners
Dutch male poets
Dutch male novelists
P. C. Hooft Award winners
People from Groningen (city)
University of Groningen alumni